MRH may refer to:

MRH-90, Australian designation of NHIndustries NH90 helicopter
Michael J. Smith Field, Beaufort, North Carolina, USA, airport IATA code

MRH may also stand for:
March of Remembrance and Hope, a student program
Montgomery Regional Hospital, later Lewis-Gale Hospital Montgomery, Blacksburg, Virginia, USA

See also
MRHS (disambiguation)